Escadron de Ravitaillement en Vol et de Transport 1/31 Bretagne is a French Air and Space Force (Armée de l'air et de l'espace) Air Refueling and Transport Squadron located at Istres-Le Tubé Air Base, Bouches-du-Rhône, France which operates the Airbus A330 Phénix.

See also

 List of French Air and Space Force aircraft squadrons

References

French Air and Space Force squadrons